Innamincka may refer to:
Innamincka, South Australia, a town and locality
Innamincka Airport, an airport in South Australia (refer List of airports in Australia)
Innamincka Regional Reserve, a protected area in South Australia
Innamincka Station, a pastoral lease in South Australia